Pedro Fernandes may refer to:

Pedro Fernandes de Queirós (1563–1614), Portuguese navigator in the service of Spain
Pedro Fernandes Ribeiro (born 1949), Brazilian Labor Party politician
Pedro Fernandes (footballer) (born 1985), Pedro Emanuel da Silva Fernandes, Portuguese footballer
Pedro Fernandes Lopes (born 1986), Cape Verdean politician
Pedro Fernandes Neto (politician), Democratic Labor Party candidate in the 2018 Rio de Janeiro gubernatorial election
Pedro Fernandes Neto, Brazilian physician known for his work with venous translucence